Xavier Institute of Management and Entrepreneurship (XIME) is a private business school with three fully residential campuses, in Bangalore, Kochi and Chennai, all in India.  XIME is currently being led by Anil J Philip as the President. The Institute pioneered the Association of BRICS Business Schools (ABBS, estd 2008) which is a platform for management education in Brazil, Russia, India, China and South Africa.

XIME arranges international events in collaboration with seventeen partner institutions around the globe which is popularly known as Student Exchange Programme, including campus exchange programmes, faculty exchange programmes and an international study tour for its students. XIME took the initiative in formation of Association of BRICS Business Schools (ABBS), thus bringing together Brazil, Russia, India, China and South Africa. XIME offers a two-year PGDM course with specialization in Marketing, Finance, HR, Operations and Business Analytics. XIME Banglore also offers PGCM in Construction Management and Healthcare Management.

Ranking 
Ranked 45th best in South India by Outlook-ICARE India MBA Rankings 2020

References

Related links
 

All India Council for Technical Education
Business schools in Chennai
1991 establishments in Karnataka
Educational institutions established in 1991
Business schools in Bangalore